Microcos crassifolia, also known locally as chanderai or bunsi, is a species of flowering plant, a fruit tree in the mallow family, that is endemic to Borneo.

Description
The tree grows to no more than 10 m in height with a bole of less than 1.5 m. The smooth oval leaves are 10–30 cm long by 6–9 cm wide. The axillary or terminal inflorescences bear small white or cream flowers. The fruits are pear-shaped orange drupes, 2–2.5 cm by 1–1.5 cm in diameter, containing an 8 mm seed in an edible, juicy, fibrous orange mesocarp.

Distribution and habitat
The species is endemic to Borneo where it is known from Sabah and Sarawak as an understorey tree of lowland riparian and swamp forests. It is rarely cultivated.

References

 
crassifolia
Endemic flora of Borneo
Trees of Borneo
Fruits originating in Asia
Plants described in 1926
Taxa named by Max Burret